Licensed to Love and Kill is a 1979 imitation James Bond film starring Gareth Hunt as British secret agent Charles Bind. It was directed and written by Lindsay Shonteff and produced by his wife Elizabeth Gray. The film had the working title An Orchid for No. 1; it was released on VHS under the title The Man from S.E.X..

Plot
Secret Agent Charles Bind is called in to investigate the disappearance of Lord Dangerfield, a British diplomat. The trail leads Bind to Dangefield's daughter Carlotta Muff-Dangerfield who is called "Lotta Muff", an ambitious American Senator named Lucifer Orchid, and Bind's counterpart in the forces of evil, Ultra One.

Cast
 Gareth Hunt ...  Charles Bind
 Nick Tate ...  Jensen Fury 
 Fiona Curzon ...  Carlotta Muff-Dangerfield
 Geoffrey Keen ...  Stockwell 
 Gary Hope ...  Senator Lucifer Orchid 
 Don Fellows ...  Vice-president 
 John Arnatt ...  Merlin 
 Toby Robins ...  Scarlet Star 
 Imogen Hassall ...  Miss Martin 
 John Junkin ...  Helicopter mechanic 
 Me Me Lai ...  Female Madam Wang 
 Noel Johnson ...  Lord Dangerfield 
 Anna Bergman ... Hotel receptionist
 Eiji Kusuhara ...  Male Madam Wang 
 Doug Robinson ...  Giant
 Deep Roy ...  Midget

Aspects of production
During the production of Henson and Shonteff's previous Charles Bind film No. 1 of the Secret Service, a sequel was announced entitled An Orchid for No. 1. Though initially signed to Shonteff for three films, Nicky Henson was signed by the Royal Shakespeare Company. Henson was replaced by Gareth Hunt who was well known for his role as secret agent Mike Gambit in The New Avengers. Geoffrey Keen repeated his role as Bind's M type superior Rockwell. The original Rockwell from the Tom Adams Charles Vine films was played by John Arnatt who returned to Shonteff's series playing Merlin, the Q type character who issues Bind his secret weapons. Fiona Curzon who plays the female lead had a smaller different role in the previous No 1. of the Secret Service. Gary Hope had a role as an Army officer in the first Vine film Licensed to Kill.

Soundtrack
Simon Bell wrote the music and Doreen Chanter composed and performed the theme song, Love is a Fine Thing.

Reception
Alan Burton in Historical Dictionary of British Spy Fiction, which cites that "the cycle of spy films began to lose steam in the 1970s", and mentions Licensed to Love and Kill and its preceding film No. 1 of the Secret Service as "the odd picture [that] turned up in the cinema schedules", refers to both films as "crude parodies".

References

External links
 

1979 films
British parody films
1970s spy comedy films
1970s parody films
Films directed by Lindsay Shonteff
British spy comedy films
Parody films based on James Bond films
1979 comedy films
1970s English-language films